Gregor Iwan Alexis Feodor Aminoff (4 April 1897 – 26 April 1977) was a Swedish diplomat and chamberlain.

Career
Aminoff was born on 4 April 1897 in Stockholm, Sweden, son of the cabinet chamberlain Gregor Aminoff and his wife Elisabeth (née af Edholm). He was ryttmästare in the Life Regiment of Horse (K 1) in 1934 and received a Bachelor of Arts degree in 1925 before becoming an attaché at the Ministry for Foreign Affairs in 1926. Aminoff left in 1928 and then worked in private companies. He served as chamberlain of the Duke and Duchess of Västergotland from 1935 to 1950, and he was back at the Foreign Ministry in 1938.

Aminoff became first secretary in 1939, first legation secretary in London in 1941, in Washington, D.C. in 1943, and was legation counsellor there in 1943. He was envoy in Athens from 1949 to 1951 and foreign affairs councillor and head of the human resources department at the Foreign Ministry from 1951 to 1954. Aminoff was then envoy in Pretoria from 1954 to 1959, ambassador in Lisbon from 1959 to 1963 and ambassador in Monrovia from 1959 to 1961 (accredited from Lisbon). He was Marshal of the Diplomatic Corps (Introduktör av främmande sändebud) from 1970 to 1974 (deputy in 1966) and Grand Master of the Ceremonies from 1971 to 1977.

Personal life
In 1925 he married Märtha Linder (1900–1991), the daughter of general Ernst Linder and baroness Augusta (née Wrangel von Brehmer). He was the father of Gregor (born 1926) and Alexandra (born 1933). He died on 26 April 1977 in Stockholm and was buried at Norra begravningsplatsen in Stockholm.

Awards and decorations

King Gustaf V's Jubilee Commemorative Medal (1948)
Commander First Class of the Order of the Polar Star
Knight of the Order of Vasa
Grand Cross of the Order of Prince Henry
Grand Cross of the Order of the Phoenix
Grand Commander of the Humane Order of African Redemption
Commander First Class of the Order of the Dannebrog
Commander of the Order of St. Olav with star
Commander of the Order of the Crown
Commander of the Order of the White Rose of Finland
Commander of the Order of the Crown of Italy
Commander of the Order of Polonia Restituta
Knight of the Legion of Honour

References

1897 births
1977 deaths
Ambassadors of Sweden to Greece
Ambassadors of Sweden to South Africa
Ambassadors of Sweden to Portugal
Ambassadors of Sweden to Liberia
People from Stockholm
Commanders First Class of the Order of the Polar Star
Knights of the Order of Vasa
Swedish nobility
Burials at Norra begravningsplatsen
Alexis